The 1972 Cork Junior Football Championship was the 74th staging of the Cork Junior Football Championship since its establishment by Cork County Board in 1895. The championship ran from 15 October to 10 December 1972.

The final was played on 10 December 1972 at Rossa Park in Skibbereen, between Bantry Blues and Adrigole, in what was their first ever meeting in the final. Bantry Blues won the match by 1-12 to 2-06 to claim their first ever championship title. Adrigole became the first team to lose three successive finals, while it was also their fourth defeat in five years.

Bantry's Declan Barron was the championship's top scorer with 0-17.

Qualification

Results

Quarter-finals

Semi-finals

Final

Championship statistics

Top scorers

References

1972 in Irish sport
Cork Junior Football Championship